Phuljhuri Khan (born as Yaar Rasul Khan; 1920 – May 5, 1982) was a tabla and esraj player from Bangladesh. He was also an accomplished sanai, sitar, and pakhawaj player.

Khan was born in 1920 in Beetgarh, British India, now under Nabinagar Upazila (sub-district), Brahmanbaria District, Bangladesh. He was the eldest son of Latif Rasul Khan and Begum Kamala-un-nesa. From his maternal side, he belongs to the noted family of Ustad (Maestro) Alauddin Khan, the world reputed Maestro of Seni-Maihar and Alauddin Gharana of Indian classical music. His mother was the eldest daughter of Fakir (Saint) Aftabuddin Khan, who was the elder brother of Ustad Alauddin Khan, and Ustad Ayet Ali Khan.

Early life and training

Khan learned tabla from his maternal grandfather Aftabuddin Khan in his boyhood. Then he went to Maihar state of India (currently under Madhya Pradesh) to learn tabla from Ustad Alauddin Khan, the state musician. He received training in tabla from him for eight years.

Career and achievements

Maharaja of Maiher was captivated by Khan's strumming on tabla during a performance and bestowed on him the title Phuljhuri (i.e. fireworks that emit starry sparks). Gradually he became more renowned as Phuljhuri Khan. He later joined Maihar Orchestra and used to accompany Ustad Alauddin Khan with tabla. He joined Ustad Allauddin Khan in Lucknow Conference several times. He returned to his village home and received Talim in esraj from Ustad Ayet Ali Khan (Aftabuddin Khan's youngest brother) for five years.

He traveled many countries as a member of Udayshankar Ballet Troupe, where he played tabla, pakhawaj, and esraj.

He was a music teacher in Shantiniketan and also played instruments for the composition of Nobel Laureate Poet Rabindranath Tagore, under the poet's own direction. He had memorable performance on esraj in the drama Chitrangada.

He established a music school in Shilong.

He joined Radio Pakistan and then Radio Bangladesh, Dhaka as staff artiste from 1949 - 1975. He also played esraj for many films, television, stage and discs. The notable names of the  films include Aakash ar Mati (The Sky and the Earth), Mukh o Mukhosh (Face and Mask), Rajdhanir Bukey (In the Heart of the Capital City), Natun Sur (New Tune), Surya Snan (Sun Bath), and Surya Grahan (Solar Eclipse).

Awards and distinctions
 Bangladesh Shilpakala Academy (The National Academy of Fine and Performing Arts) (1977)
 Independence Day Award (1979)

Government of Bangladesh published commemorative postage stamps on him in 2005.

Death and legacy
Khan died on May 5, 1982, in Dhaka. His sons are instrument players — Md. Yunus Khan (sarod), Md. Jafar Khan (sitar), Md. Yusuf Khan (sarod), Md. Ilias Khan (tabla), and Md. Khairul Islam Khan (tabla).

References

External links
 Bangladesh Sangeet Series: 1, by AL Mahmud, A.K.M. Mujtaba, Edited by Dr. Muhammad Shirajul Islam, published by Bangladesh Shilpakala Academy
 Mobarak Hossain Khan's official home page

1920 births
1982 deaths
Bengali musicians
20th-century Bangladeshi male singers
20th-century Bangladeshi singers
Recipients of the Independence Day Award
People from Brahmanbaria district